Gerli Liinamäe (born 21 March 1995) is an Estonian figure skater. She is the 2017 Volvo Open Cup champion, the 2019 Nordic silver medalist, and a four-time (2011, 2015, 2018, 2019) Estonian national champion. She has competed in the final segment at five ISU Championships. Her best placements were 13th at the 2011 European Championships and 14th at the 2012 World Junior Championships.

Programs

Competitive highlights 
CS: Challenger Series; JGP: Junior Grand Prix

References

External links 

 
 Gerli Liinamäe at Tracings

Estonian female single skaters
1995 births
Living people
Figure skaters from Tallinn
Competitors at the 2019 Winter Universiade